Ulla Birgitta Helena Andersson (born Andersson; 20 April 1933) is a Swedish actress and comedian.

Career

Andersson made her breakthrough by acting in various variety shows with Povel Ramel and Karl Gerhard. She was part of the group around Hasse & Tage, acting in revues such as Gula Hund, Docking the Boat (Att Angöra en Brygga), Spader, Madame!, The Apple War (Äppelkriget), Ägget är löst, The Adventures of Picasso (Picassos Äventyr) and Häxan Surtant.

In 1967, she portrayed Teskedsgumman (Mrs. Pepperpot) in the Swedish advent calendar with the same name. The programme became very popular and has been re-run on Swedish television. Later, she also portrayed two other characters on children's shows: Hedvig in Från A till Ö - En Resa Orden runt (From A to Ö - A Trip Around the Words) from 1974 and the small troll Daisy in Trolltider (Trolltimes) from 1979.

Andersson played Doris in the Jönssonligan movies, and she provided the Swedish voice for Lady Kluck in the Walt Disney animated movie Robin Hood and Blomhåret in Dunderklumpen.

She has become a well-liked and popular actress in Sweden with a characteristic dialect (västgötska), and although her main forte has been comedy, she has also had more serious and character roles.

Awards
She received the Guldbagge Honorary Award, which is the Swedish film industry lifetime honorary award, in 2016.

Personal life
Andersson was born in Mariestad in 1933. She has two children, the pianist Matti Bye (born 1966) with her then-husband Anders Bye, and Hanna Z Gradin with the Swedish writer Carl Zetterström.

Selected filmography
 Dance in the Smoke (1954)
 Laugh Bomb (1954)
 The Girl in the Rain (1955)
 Moon Over Hellesta (1956)
 Guest at One's Own Home (1957)
 Mother Takes a Vacation (1957)
 Woman in a Fur Coat (1958)
 The Great Amateur (1958)
 Crime in Paradise (1959)
 No Time to Kill (1959)
 Raskenstam (1983)

References

External links

1933 births
Living people
People from Mariestad Municipality
Swedish actresses
Swedish comedians